The 2022 Tallahassee Tennis Challenger was a professional tennis tournament played on green clay courts. It was the 22nd edition of the tournament which was part of the 2022 ATP Challenger Tour. It took place in Tallahassee, Florida, United States between 18 and 24 April 2022.

Singles main-draw entrants

Seeds

 1 Rankings as of April 11, 2022.

Other entrants
The following players received wildcards into the singles main draw:
  Antoine Cornut Chauvinc
  Aleksandar Kovacevic
  Alex Rybakov

The following players received entry from the qualifying draw:
  Gijs Brouwer
  Daniel Dutra da Silva
  Arthur Fils
  Christian Langmo
  Jonathan Mridha
  Mikael Torpegaard

Champions

Singles

 Wu Tung-lin def.  Michael Mmoh 6–3, 6–4.

Doubles

 Gijs Brouwer /  Christian Harrison def.  Diego Hidalgo /  Cristian Rodríguez 4–6, 7–5, [10–6].

References

2022 ATP Challenger Tour
2022
2022 in American tennis
2022 in sports in Florida
April 2022 sports events in the United States